Breadfruit  may refer to:
 Breadfruit (Artocarpus altilis), a species of flowering tree widely grown for their edible fruit. It is also used to refer to the following closely related species:
Artocarpus blancoi (tipolo or antipolo) of the Philippines
Artocarpus mariannensis (dugdug, seeded breadfruit, or Marianas breadfruit) of Micronesia
Artocarpus camansi (breadnut or seeded breadfruit) of New Guinea, the Maluku Islands, and the Philippines
 African breadfruit (Treculia africana), a tree species 
 Highland breadfruit (Ficus dammaropsis), a tropical fig tree native to the highlands and highlands fringe of New Guinea
 Mexican breadfruit (Monstera deliciosa), a creeping vine native to tropical rainforests of southern Mexico south to Panama